Annapurna Secondary English Boarding School is an independent private urban school situated at the heart of Myanglung of Terhathum District in the eastern development region of Nepal. It is being operated smoothly by the group in collaboration. It is indeed situated exactly at market centre of Myanglung. The school is currently being run by Mr. Gajendra Kandangwa who is the principal and founder as well of this school. This school has the facility of providing home stay studies or facility of allowing students to live under its control for their studies. It is indeed a sister school and the sister schools with the same name running from the same control are available in many places of Nepal.

Curriculum 
The teaching methods are on the basis of National Curriculum of Nepal by which the school has been teaching its students since the date it established. It has grades from Nursery to 10 and shortly after the final exam or SLC exam the successful students in the result are directly referred or sent to other higher schools.

References

Boarding schools in Nepal